Bettor's Delight is a former champion American Standardbred race-horse and one of the World's greatest stud stallions.

Bettor's Delight was foaled on 4 May 1998 and bred by Winbak Farm of Chesapeake City, Maryland. He was purchased for $65,000 at the 1999 Harrisburg yearling sale by John B. Grant of Milton, Ontario.

In 2007 he was inducted into the Canadian Horse Racing Hall of Fame and in 2013 into the Harness Racing Museum & Hall of Fame.

It is believed that Bettors Delight is the highest ever income-earning pacing or harness racing stallion.

Race record

Bettor's Delight was trained by Scott McEneny and usually driven by Michel Lachance. 
 
As a 2-year old in 2000 he won the Nassagaweya Stake, Breeders Crown 2YO Colt & Gelding Pace and Governors Cup. He also won the Dan Patch Award (U.S.) Two-Year-Old Pacing Colt of the Year category and O'Brien (Canada) Two-Year-Old Colt Pacer of the Year awards.

As a 3-year old in 2001 Better's Delight won:
 New Jersey Classic Pace. His father Cam's Card Shark won this same race in 1994.
 North America Cup. Cam's Card Shark also won this race in 1994.
 Simcoe Stakes. 
 Little Brown Jug and 
 Tattersalls Pace.

He won the O'Brien Awards for Three-Year-Old Colt Pacer of the Year and Horse of the Year, along with the Dan Patch Award for Three-Year-Old Pacing Colt of the Year.

Stud record

Bettor’s Delight commenced standing as a stud stallion at Blue Chip Farms in New York in 2002 before moving to Winbak Farm, Ontario in 2012. For 2013 and 2014 he stood in Pennsylvania, before returning to Ontario for the following year. Since 2007 he has also been a shuttle sire at Woodlands Stud, Auckland, New Zealand.

Bettor's Delight was named sire of the decades for 2000–2019 in America and has been the leading sire in both New Zealand and Australia on multiple occasions. His service fee in New Zealand was raised to $25,000 to reduce demand.

His progeny includes:
 Adore Me: winner of the 2014 New Zealand Trotting Cup.
 Bettor Sweet: winner of the 2011 and 2012 Breeders Crown Open Pace.
 Bettor's Wish: winner of the 2020 McKee Memorial, Dayton Pacing Derby, TVG Final and the 2020 Dan Patch Award for Older Pacer of the Year.
 Darlin's Delight: 2006 Dan Patch Award winner for best three-year-old filly pacer and winner of the Three Diamonds, Fan Hanover, Milton, Lady Liberty, and Golden Girls.
 Gold Ace: winner of the 2010 Sire Stakes Final, 2011 New Zealand Derby, 2011 Golden Nugget (Perth) and 2012 New Zealand Free For All.
 Have Faith in Me: winner of the 2015 New Zealand Derby.
 Chicago Bull: winner of the 2016 West Australian Derby, 2017 West Australian Cup and the 2017 & 2020 Fremantle Cups.
 Lazarus: Two-times New Zealand Horse of the Year, winner of the 2016 and 2017 New Zealand Trotting Cup and 2017 Inter Dominion Pacing Championship. 
 Peaky Sneaky: winner of Breeders Crown 3YO Filly Pace, Glen Garsey and Bluegrass Stakes. 
 Scarlett Hanover: ONSS Champion at 2 year old and 3 year old.  O'Brien pacing filly of the year at 2.
 Self Assured: winner of the 2019 and 2021 Auckland Pacing Cup and 2020 New Zealand Trotting Cup.
 Silver Label: winner of the Champlain Stake and multiple ONTSS.
 Tall Dark Stranger: winner of the North American Cup and Meadowlands Pace.  Dan Patch Award Horse and Pacer of the Year in 2020.
 Tiger Tara: winner of the 2018 Inter Dominion Pacing Championship, 2019 A G Hunter Cup and 2019 Australian Harness Horse of the Year.
 Ultimate Sniper: winner of the 2019 Inter Dominion Pacing Championship.

See also
 Harness racing in New Zealand

References

1998 racehorse births
American Standardbred racehorses
American Champion harness horses
Harness racing in the United States
Harness racing in New Zealand